The following lists events that happened during 2006 in Saudi Arabia.

Incumbents
Monarch: Abdullah
Crown Prince: Sultan

Events

January
 January 26 - Saudi Arabia withdraws its ambassadors to Denmark, due to the Muhammad cartoons.

Deaths

June 
 June 20 – Sa'd ibn Junaydil, historical geographer. (b. 1915)

References

 
2000s in Saudi Arabia
Years of the 21st century in Saudi Arabia
Saudi Arabia
Saudi Arabia